James Watkins is Professor of Biomechanics in the College of Engineering at Swansea University, Swansea, Wales UK (2002–2014). During the period 2000–2009, Professor Watkins was Head of the Department of Sports Science and Director of the Sport and Exercise Science Research Centre. Professor Watkins was formerly at Jordanhill College, Glasgow, Scotland, UK (1974–1993) and at the University of Strathclyde, Glasgow, Scotland, UK (1993–2000). He is an advisory board member of the Journal of Sports Sciences.

He was chairman of the biomechanics section of the British Association of Sport and Exercise Sciences from 1993–96 and a member of the sports-related subjects panel in the 1996 and 2001 Research Assessment Exercises.

He is a fellow of the Higher Education Academy (FHEA), a fellow of the British Association of Sport and Exercise Sciences (FBASES), a fellow of the Physical Education Association of the United Kingdom (FPEAUK) and an honorary member of the Association for Physical Education (afPE).

Books

External links
 UWS staff page
 British Association of Sport and Exercise Sciences

Living people
British bioengineers
Academics of Swansea University
People from Swansea
British scientists
Academics of the University of Strathclyde
British male writers
Year of birth missing (living people)
Fellows of the Higher Education Academy
Male non-fiction writers